Ely Branch is a stream in Ralls County in the U.S. state of Missouri. It is a tributary of the Salt River.

Ely Branch has the name of Benjamin S. Ely, a pioneer settler.

See also
List of rivers of Missouri

References

Rivers of Ralls County, Missouri
Rivers of Missouri